Crossharbour is a light metro station on the Docklands Light Railway (DLR) Bank-Lewisham Line in Cubitt Town, East London. The station is situated on the Isle of Dogs and is between Mudchute and South Quay stations and is in Travelcard Zone 2.

The Docklands Light Railway station opened as "Crossharbour" on 31 August 1987 on the site of the former Millwall Docks railway station, and was renamed in 1994 to "Crossharbour and London Arena". Since the neighbouring London Arena has been demolished (in 2006) the original name has been reinstated. The name "Crossharbour" refers to the nearby Glengall Bridge across Millwall Inner Dock.

Layout
There are two platforms at the station with a reversing siding between the two running tracks just to the south of the station, and some trains (mainly from Stratford DLR station) used to terminate here as Lewisham DLR station was unable to handle too many trains. Nowadays however, it is rare to see trains terminate at Crossharbour, as many trains from Stratford now terminate at Canary Wharf DLR station.

The St John's Estate is a social housing estate adjacent to the DLR station.

Connections
London Buses routes 135, 277 and the D prefix routes D6 and D8 serve the station at Crossharbour bus station; additionally 277 has a 24-hour service.

References

External links 

 Docklands Light Railway website – Crossharbour station page
 Images of Crossharbour station and place by Flickr members

Docklands Light Railway stations in the London Borough of Tower Hamlets
Railway stations in Great Britain opened in 1987